Season 2009–10 saw Greenock Morton compete in their third consecutive season in the First Division, in which they finished 8th after a last day victory over Ayr United which relegated the visitors.

Story of the season

May

After the end of the 2008–09 season, Kieran McAnespie (signed for amateur side Milngavie Wanderers), Jamie Stevenson (signed for East Stirlingshire), Chris Smith (signed for Dumbarton) and Jon Newby (signed for Northwich Victoria) were all released.

Brian Graham returned from his loan spell at East Stirlingshire, where he finished as the Third Division's top scoring forward.

June

Neil MacFarlane was brought in under freedom of contract from Queen of the South.

July

Bryn Halliwell signed as emergency goalkeeping cover following injuries to Kevin Cuthbert and Colin Stewart.

August

At the end of Halliwell's short-term contract, he was released before the close of the transfer window thus making him available to sign for a new club at any time after the window shut.

Morton were knocked out of the two SFL cup competitions by Ross County and Kilmarnock, after victories over Dumbarton and Cowdenbeath.

September

Davie Irons and Derek Collins had their contracts as the club's management team cancelled on 21 September, with the club sitting bottom of the First Division with only three points from their first six games. Allan McManus and James Grady took over as caretakers until replacements for Irons and Collins could be appointed.

Iain Russell was loaned out to Alloa Athletic.

October

McManus and Grady were appointed permanently (until the end of the season) on Halloween 2009. This time though, Grady was made manager with McManus his assistant.

November

With injuries mounting up, Grady brought in Alan Reid and David van Zanten in on trial. Both players made their débuts on 7 November, against Partick Thistle, this was however Reid's THIRD début for the club having played two games on trial the previous season and having a spell on loan in 2001. On 10 November, it was revealed in the Greenock Telegraph that van Zanten had signed on a permanent contract until January 2010.

Alan Reid was signed on a permanent basis on 27 November, following the release of Ryan Harding by mutual consent.

December

After a replay, Morton defeated Dumbarton, to set up a Scottish Cup fourth round tie at Cappielow against Celtic.

January

David van Zanten's short-term deal at Cappielow expires, and the Irishman signs for Hamilton Academical.

Ex-Celtic youth Michael Tidser returns from Sweden, where he played for Ostersunds FK to sign with Morton.

Alex Walker was loaned out to Brechin City for three months.

Brian Wake was released, with his next destination being Gateshead.

As the transfer window slammed shut, Kevin McKinlay was signed on a free transfer.

February

Erik Paartalu signed a pre-contract agreement with Brisbane Roar back in his homeland of Australia.

Donovan Simmonds was signed until the end of the season on a free transfer from Maltese Premier League side Floriana.

March

Austrian Striker David Witteveen signed on loan from Hearts until the end of the season.

Iain Russell and Ryan McWilliams were sent out on loan to Stirling Albion and Largs Thistle respectively.

April

Jim McAlister broke his foot in a 3–3 draw with Queen of the South – this was most likely his final game for Morton with his contract running down at the end of the season.

Michael Tidser was awarded the Scottish Football League young player of the month award for March.

May

With a 2–1 victory at Cappielow over Ayr United, Morton avoided relegation to the Second Division whilst condemning their opponents to automatic relegation.

First team transfers
From end of 2008–09 season, to last match of season 2009–10

In

Out

Squad (that played for first team)

Fixtures and results

Friendlies

Irn-Bru Scottish Football League First Division

Active Nation Scottish Cup

League Cup

Challenge Cup

League table

Player statistics

All competitions

References

See also 

Greenock Morton
Greenock Morton F.C. seasons